The Department of Health, Housing and Community Services was an Australian government department that existed between June 1991 and March 1993.

Scope
Information about the department's functions and/or government funding allocation could be found in the Administrative Arrangements Orders, the annual Portfolio Budget Statements and in the Department's annual reports.

At its creation, the Department was responsible for:
Services for the aged, people with disabilities and families with children 
Community support services 
Housing 
Public health, research and preventive medicine
Community health projects
Health promotion
Pharmaceutical benefits
Health benefits schemes
Human quarantine
National drug abuse strategy

Structure
The Department was an Australian Public Service department, staffed by officials who were responsible to the Minister for Health, Housing and Community Services, Brian Howe.

The Secretary of the Department was S.A. Hamilton.

References

Ministries established in 1991
Health, Housing and Community Services
1991 establishments in Australia
1993 disestablishments in Australia